Threads of Life is the fifth studio album by American heavy metal band Shadows Fall. Released on April 3, 2007, in the U.S. through Atlantic Records, the album debuted at number 46 on the Billboard 200. The first single, "Redemption", made its premiere on Sirius Radio's Hard Attack station on February 16, 2007 and was released on iTunes on February 20. "Redemption" received a Grammy Award nomination for Best Metal Performance at the 50th Grammy Awards.

Background
Shadows Fall finished their contract on Century Media after the release of Fallout from the War, and signed with Atlantic Records for this release. The album was released outside of the U.S. through Roadrunner Records. This is the band's only album with these two record labels. The ballad "Another Hero Lost," was inspired by the death of Brian Fair's cousin, who was stationed in Iraq.

Recording
The band entered the studio during September, 2006, to begin recording the album. It was recorded at Dave Grohl's Studio 606 in Northridge, a community located in Los Angeles, California. The band overwrote for this album, and ended up bringing thirteen songs to the studio. According to Brain Fair, this was the first time the band had more than enough material for a record. Threads of Life was the first, and only, Shadows Fall album to be produced by Nick Raskulinecz, known for working with Foo Fighters and Velvet Revolver. Raskulinecz grew up listening to thrash metal, according to Fair, and thus fit well with the sound the band was looking to create. The deviation from Zeuss, who has produced most of the band's albums, was explained by bassist Paul Romanko in an interview:

The album was still mixed by Zeuss, allowing for some familiarity, and Romanko notes that it was Zeuss himself who originally suggested the change.
The label, Atlantic Records, had no influence musically on the album. The label did not hear the album until after it was mastered. In regards to the overall recording process, Fair commented, "We didn’t write a safe record."

Reception
Threads of Life received positive reviews from critics. Alternative Press stated, "Threads of Life is the most unashamedly 'true' metal album any major label's released yet this year — and it's also one of the best." MetalSucks complimented the band's effort stating, "Threads of Life is exactly what you would expect from Shadows Fall — aggressive thrash riffing and Swedish death-metal inspired guitar interplay underneath Brian Fair’s assortment of screams, singing, and something halfway in between the two — only this time the band has refined their songwriting abilities even further and lets their ’80s hair metal influences hang out even more." The Phoenix added to this praise, "Threads of Life is rife with catchy, immaculately produced riffs, and singer Brian Fair has refined the gruff bellow heard on previous albums into a competently tuneful Hetfeldian growl; the call-and-response between Fair and the syrupy, multi-tracked clean singing of guitarist Matt Bachand sounds better than ever."

Several critics addressed the more mainstream sound of the album. Blabbermouth provided a good summary, "The band has hit that very elusive line between broadening the appeal of the music and selling out completely – talk about the art of balance!" 411Mania added that "the production could  been a bit more gritty and had more of an edge to it." Perhaps the largest critic in this aspect was Vince Neilstein of MetalSucks, who criticized the "overwhelming presence of auto-tune on Brian Fair’s voice during the clean sung parts," concluding that it overly detracted from the listening experience.

"Redemption" received a Grammy Award nomination for Best Metal Performance during December, 2007. Brain Fair explained, "The song is a celebration of the power of music and the human voice as an agent of change and to have it recognized in such a way is incredible." The 50th Grammy Awards took place on February 12, 2008, with the award ultimately going to Slayer. Other nominees in the category were King Diamond, Machine Head, and As I Lay Dying.

Track listing

Personnel

Shadows Fall
Brian Fair – lead vocals
Jon Donais – lead guitar, backing vocals
Matt Bachand – rhythm guitar, clean vocals
Paul Romanko – bass
Jason Bittner – drums

Production
Produced by Nick Raskulinecz
Mixed by Zeuss
Engineered by Paul Fig
Mastered by Ted Jensen
A&R by John Rubeli and Anthony Delia
Second engineering by John Lousteau and additional engineering by Nick Raskulinecz
"Dread Uprising" live rehearsal mixed and mastered by Chris Athens

Chart positions
Album

Singles

References

Shadows Fall albums
2007 albums
Roadrunner Records albums
Atlantic Records albums
Albums produced by Nick Raskulinecz